This was the first edition of the event.  Irina-Camelia Begu and María Irigoyen won the title, defeating Johanna Larsson and Chanelle Scheepers in the final, 6–2, 6–0.

Seeds

Draw

Draw

References
 Main Draw

Rio Open - Women's Doubles
Rio
Rio Open